CKA may refer to:

 Atlantic Croaker, FAO fish species code
 Chief Kitsap Academy
 Kegelman Air Force Auxiliary Field, United States (IATA airport code)